Boog may refer to:


People

Surname
 Adolf von Boog (1866–1929), Austro-Hungarian Army officer who served in World War I
 Horst Boog (1928–2016), German historian
 Rik van den Boog (born 1959), Dutch football manager and former player
 Sean Boog, half of the hip hop duo The Away Team

Nickname
 Dennis Highberger (born 1959), American politician
 Boog Powell (born 1941), American professional baseball player
 Boog Powell (outfielder) (1993), American professional baseball player
 Jon Sciambi (born 1970), American sportscaster

Ring name
 Rick Boogs, American professional wrestler Eric Bugenhagen (born 1987)

Fictional characters
 Boog, the main character of the Open Season film series
 Boogregard "Boog" Shlizetti, a bully in Fanboy & Chum Chum, an American animated television series

See also
 J-Boog, a member of the American boy band B2K
 Booge, South Dakota
 Boogie (disambiguation)
 Booger (disambiguation)
 Boogey (disambiguation)
 Böögg, an effigy of winter burned during the Swiss spring holiday Sechseläuten

Lists of people by nickname